George Paul may refer to:
 George Howard Paul (1826–1890), American newspaperman, businessman and politician
 George St Paul (1562–1613), English politician
 George Vivian Paul, Indian standup comedian
 Sir George Onesiphorus Paul, 2nd Baronet (1746–1820), English prison reformer and philanthropist
 George Andrew Paul (1912-1963), British philosopher

See also
 Paul George (disambiguation)